T. japonica  may refer to:
 Thalassomya japonica, a midge species in the genus Thalassomya
 Theretra japonica, a moth species found in Japan, China, Korea and Russia
 Tilia japonica, the Japanese lime or shina, a tree species in the genus Tilia
 Torilis japonica, the Japanese hedge parsley, a plant species
 Tylotiella japonica, a sea snail species

See also
 Japonica (disambiguation)